Baba Dharam Dass was a holy man during the reign of Mughal Emperor Akbar. He is worshiped as an ancestor by all Jains from the village of Pasrur in Sialkot District  in the Punjab province of Pakistan.

Baba Dharam Dass Tomb in Pasrur 
Pasrur has a famous tomb of a Jain Baba, Baba Dharam Dass who is the ancestor of most Jains living in Pasrur. His tomb is now in ruins. Last recorded visit to the tomb was made by some Jains from Delhi in 1980's to retrieve a few bricks from it to incorporate in the replica's of the Baba Dharam Dass tomb made one in Meerut and another in Ludhiana in India. It is the author's opinion that this tomb is located in the vicinity of the Gurdwara Manji Sahib in Pasrur in Deoka.

A Jain merchant trader from the town of 'Oshowal' (Oswal in district Marwar in the state of Rajasthan in India) who had financially supported Raja Maan Singh was granted a large part of fertile land which is now Pasrur. The Jain merchant had to move to and live in Pasrur in order to avail of his grant. This was gladly accepted and he became the 'Jaamindaar' of the area of Pasrur.

The new owner of the land brought many farmers from his home town and from neighbouring areas to till the land. Slowly a small town developed in the area. One of the descendents of the original Jaamindaar was 'Baba Dharam Dass' whose tomb is located on the other side of the creek named 'Deoka' (or is it Degh?) just outside Pasrur boundary. Two different replicas of 'Baaba Dharam Dass's tomb have been made by his descendents, one near the town of Meerut, 60 kilometers from New Delhi and other just on the outskirts of the city of Ludhiana in Punjab, India.

References

http://www.pasrur.info/JainDeoka.htm

Year of birth missing
Year of death missing
Place of birth missing
Jainism in Pakistan
16th-century Indian Jains